Tulsipur, Nepal may refer to:

Tulsipur, Rapti
Tulsipur, Sagarmatha